François Piquemal is a French politician and educator who was elected to represent the Haute-Garonne's 4th constituency in the 2022 legislative election. A member of La France Insoumise, Piquemal ran as a candidate of the left-wing New Ecologic and Social People's Union (NUPES) coalition in 2022. Piquemal previously served as a municipal councilor in Toulouse, Occitania.

Biography 
A resident of Toulouse's  neighborhood, Piquemal is a career history and geography teacher. At the time of his election to the National Assembly, Piquemal served as a member of the Toulouse municipal council.

2022 National Assembly election 
Piquemal officially entered the race for Haute-Garonne's 4th constituency on September 17, 2021. Piquemal made ending homelessness in France a top campaign priority, stating "It is not acceptable" for people to "die in the streets" in France.  As a candidate, Piquemal was a vocal supporter of Jean-Luc Mélenchon's 2022 presidential candidacy.

In the second round of the contest, Piquemal faced real estate company owner Marie-Claire Constans of the Ensemble Citoyens party. Piquemal won the contest with 59.26% of the vote versus the 40.74% received by Constans.

Political views 
As a candidate, issues central to Piquemal's program were ending homelessness, boosting consumer spending power through price freezes, and environmentalist policies. Amid the historic heat wave in France in June 2022, Piquemal criticized Macron's leadership and stressed that there is an "urgent need to act" on climate.

Following his victory, Piquemal stated that his movement was following in the "footsteps of Jean Jaurès".

References 

Living people
French educators
Members of the National Assembly (France)
Politicians from Toulouse
La France Insoumise politicians
Members of Parliament for Haute-Garonne
Deputies of the 16th National Assembly of the French Fifth Republic
1984 births